"Love Don't Run" is a song written by Rachel Thibodeau, Joe Leathers and Ben Glover, and recorded by American country music singer Steve Holy.  It is the fifteenth single of his career, and was released in January 2011 as the first single and title track from his album Love Don't Run.

History
Rachel Thibodeau told Taste of Country that she "wanted to write a relationship song about sticking it out when times are tough". She co-wrote it with Joe Leathers and Ben Glover at Leathers' house in Rosemary Beach, Florida.

Critical reception
Bobby Peacock of Roughstock gave it four-and-a-half stars out of five, saying that Holy "has never sounded any better" and praising the "straightforward" lyrics. Similarly, Janet Goodman of Engine 145 said that Holy "showcases a voice with newfound maturity", and Matthew Wilkening of Taste of Country thought that Holy sang "passionately".

Music video
The music video for the song debuted on CMT.com July 22, 2011, and was directed by Eric Welch.

Chart performance

Year-end charts

References

2011 singles
Steve Holy songs
2011 songs
Curb Records singles
Songs written by Joe Leathers
Songs written by Ben Glover